Steremnius is a genus of true weevils in the beetle family Curculionidae. There are at least four described species in Steremnius.

Species
These four species belong to the genus Steremnius:
 Steremnius carinatus (Boheman, 1842) (conifer seedling weevil)
 Steremnius scrobiculatus Dalla Torre & Schenkling, 1932
 Steremnius shermani (Fiske, 1906)
 Steremnius tuberosus Gyllenhal, 1836

References

Further reading

 
 
 

Molytinae
Articles created by Qbugbot